Lopatino is a rural locality (a village) in Gorodishchenskoye Rural Settlement, Nyuksensky District, Vologda Oblast, Russia. The population was 35 as of 2002.

Geography 
Lopatino is located 41 km southeast of Nyuksenitsa (the district's administrative centre) by road. Bor is the nearest rural locality.

References 

Rural localities in Nyuksensky District